TopHit is an internet service for musicians founded in 2003. Originating from Ukraine and Russia, it now works on global scale. It offers a variety of functions, main of them regular statistical music charts based on data from radio broadcasts and musical internet services such as YouTube and Spotify. Musicians (mainly playing pop music) are able to upload their songs and promote them via TopHit. The songs from Russian and worldwide singers become aggregated, tested, distributed and rotated on radio using TopHit's capabilities. Promotion of music videos is also available, as well as donations collecting system for supporting artists. Permanent users and partners of TopHit include over 5700 musicians, music groups, DJs and tens of record labels, including Warner Music Group, Universal Music Group, Sony Music Entertainment, BMG, Black Star Inc., Velvet Music and others.

Nowadays, TopHit assists in promoting about 90% of songs on radio and over 60% of hit songs on YouTube and Spotify. TopHit's services are available for 1070 radio stations and 75 TV channels in 38 countries including Russia, Ukraine, CIS countries, European countries, Middle East countries, USA and Canada. Weekly audience of TopHit's partner broadcasters is estimated to be over 200 million of listeners and watchers. Universal Music Group qualifies TopHit as the most reliable source of music radio charts in Russia. Artists and critics emphasize that TopHit is considered firstly the professional tool for music industry, and only secondly as mass media resource.

TopHit's chart leaders are awarded annually at a ceremony called Top Hit Music Awards. There are also Top Hit Hall of Fame and annual concerts called Top Hit Live!.

History 

The idea of the TopHit project came out of the 1978-formed Soviet music band called Dialog. Members of the bang Kim Breitburg, Evgeniy Fridland and Vadim Botnaruk invented a system for searching for young talented musicians and promoting them via partnering radio stations. During 1990s, over 50 stations participated and their audience voted for best new artists. The most known of them so far are Nikolai Trubach, Konstantin Meladze and Valeriy Meladze.

Vadim Botnaruk worked at one of the radio stations, and in 2002 he joined efforts with his colleague Igor Kraev to use Internet for artist searching and voting for new hits. They established an Internet service for this, with the help of a record label ARS Records managed by Igor Krutoy. In early 2003 they entitled it mp3fm.ru.

Initially the website partnered with over 50 local radio stations, many new artists and some Russian showbiz establishment figures such as Alena Sviridova, Vladimir Kuzmin, Leonid Agutin, Alla Pugachova, Murat Nasyrov, Ilya Lagutenko. On 1 November 2003, the domain mp3fm.ru was intercepted and re-registered. The team qualified this as corporate raid and established new domain and brand TopHit.ru.

In January 2004 first annual chart was published (for 2003). TopHit determined that the most popular song among Russian-speaking listeners was "Ocean and three rivers" by Valeriy Meladze and VIA Gra. At the time, major radio networks began to join: Russkoye Radio Ukraine and international holding Europa Plus. They were shortly followed by AvtoRadio, Love Radio, Radio Maximum, Nashe Radio and others.

TopHit Live! concert was for the 1st time held in Moscow in April 2004. In 2005 TopHit became partners with record labels Sony Music Entertainment, Universal Music and Warner Music. In 2006 number of partner radio stations exceeded 400. In 2007 TopHit received the professional Popov Award for "great contribution in development of Russian radio abroad". Also since 2007 TopHit began to process music videos.

In January 2008 one of the founders, Vadim Botnaruk, was killed by unknown criminals near his home in Moscow.

In 2010 TopHit started its Ukrainian branch with registering of trademark. Also in 2010 all new music became available for radios in uncompressed .wav format. 2010 was also the year when TopHit Chart online shows were introduced. In April 2010, TopHit held a concert in Kyiv, Top Hit Live! featuring Svetlana Loboda, Gaitana, Alyona Vinnytska and other stars of the Ukrainian pop scene.

In 2011 Igor Kraev published his first analysis of radio scene in Russia based on TopHit's massive statistics.

In January 2012, the final TopHit Ukraine radio charts for 2011 were published for the first time. The most popular artists on Ukrainian radio were Vera Brezhneva, Potap, Yolka and Ani Lorak. The most rotated hits were "Petals of Tears" by Dan Balan & Vera Brezhneva, "Real Life" by Vera Brezhneva and "You're the Best" by Vlad Darwin & Alyosha.

In 2013 Top Hit Music Awards ceremony was held for the first time. Top Hit Hall of Fame was launched simultaneously. In 2015 TopHit became partners with Google to produce YouTube-based music charts:  YouTube Russia and Radio & YouTube Russia. The next year music video charts were added along with charts Top 100 Radio & YouTube Artists Russia, Top 200 Radio & YouTube Hits Russia.

In 2017, TopHit Spy service was launched to monitor music on partner radios automatically (over 800 stations by that time). In 2019 there were more than 1000 stations and project's geography expanded onto 30 countries of Europe, Asia, Middle East and the United States. TopHit's own record label started to work also in 2019.

In January 2019, TopHit published the annual YouTube Ukraine charts for the first time: the artist and video charts, and the Radio & YouTube Ukraine charts. The main hit of these charts was the song "Plakala" by KAZKA.

In 2020 TopHit Pay payment system was launched. Its main purpose is collection of donations for musicians. In 2021, TopHit became partners with Spotify streaming service to provide more charts.

In March, 2023, the Internet portal was re-launched under the new domain name tophit.com; a concert was held to commemorate.

Functionality 
TopHit is a platform for aggregating, distributing and promoting digital music content. Authors, artists, producers and record labels upload their works to TopHit website. Music radio stations and TV channels examine uploaded songs and are able to download the ones they find suitable for airing. Representatives of labels watch new artists and songs using TopHit to determine most interesting ones to work further with them.

The website's own automated service TopHit Spy is aimed to monitor music broadcast at partner radio stations and to generate statistics of aired music. This data is used to form summary radio charts. As well, similar charts for YouTube and Spotify are available. Detailed play statistics for each song are given to rights holders — artists, authors, publishers and labels.

Aggregation and distribution 

One of the main functions of TopHit is the aggregation and distribution of new radio hits to radio stations. Since 2007, TopHit has been distributing music videos on TV.

As of 1 November 2021, TopHit's music library includes more than 150 thousand radio hits, 50% of which are in English, 45% in Russian, and about 5% in other European languages. The database contains over 10 thousand music videos. Copyright holders (authors, performers, music groups, DJs, record labels) upload up to 5 new music videos for TV channels and 25-30 new songs to TopHit every day. New music that has successfully passed the test is made available for download by TopHit's partner radio stations and is included in the radio rotation.

New song testing 

Since 2009, TopHit has introduced online testing of all music novelties. Testing is carried out by music editors of TopHit partner radio stations. Depending on the test score of the track, a decision is made on its further placement on TopHit and promotion on the radio. Since 2021, testing has become continuous (preliminary testing before the song appears on the air, and subsequent on-air testing), the current rating of each track is measured by a 10-point scale, the degree of correspondence of the format of the tested track and the tester is taken into account automatically. The final rating of each track is exposed taking into account more than 10 factors with different weighting. The testing procedure consists of listening to a short version of a new track and then giving a "like" or "dislike" rating. Points, which a track gets in the course of preliminary (pre-air) testing, are subject to "inflation", depreciate and zero out in a few months. At the same time, "on-air" and "viewing" points are accumulated for each song that goes on air and on the streaming platforms. Therefore, in the end, the tracks with the most radio airplay, YouTube views, and Spotify listens have the highest ratings.

Charts 

In January 2004 TopHit published its first monthly chart Top Radio Hits and annual chart of radio singles and chart of popular musicians on radio. Per TopHit, the best track of 2003 on radio in Russia and CIS countries was the song "Ocean and three rivers", performed by Valeriy Meladze and the band VIA Gra. Since 2003 to 2016 statistics were based on reports about airplays weekly provided by radio stations themselves. Anatoly Veizenfeld and Mikhail Sergeev of Звукорежиссёр (Zvukorezhissyor: Soundproducer) magazine wrote, "That is the way, how the feedback comes from the broadcasters in this project, and it allows them to receive the data about each song rotation on air".

In 2017 Top Hit introduced digital multi-channel tuners and launched separate onair monitoring in Moscow, Saint-Petersburg and Kyiv. For playlist recognition it began to use audio recognition system. Digital metadata transmitted by radiostations is also used. Number of partnering radiostations counts more than 1000. Since 2015 TopHit also publishes charts from YouTube as well as joint chart Radio & YouTube. Spotify was added in 2021. In 2019 an audio recognition system TopHit Spy was implemented. Charts include: overall charts, weekly charts from Moscow and Kiyiv, monthly charts and yearly charts. Advanced users can use extended  features such as charts from all partner  stations. Charts are divided into weekly, monthly, quarterly, yearly, decennial. TopHit statistics are most relevant for the territories of Russia (including Moscow), Ukraine (including Kyiv), CIS countries and Eastern Europe countries.

TopHit charts are usually covered by mass media.

Top Hit Chart TV and radio shows 
TV and radio shows dedicated to TopHit charts are produced for mass media. Muz TV TV channel aired the TV show Top Hit Chart from 2010 until 2013 where 30 top songs were regularly announced. Advertology.ru monitoring service found the show to be in top-10 of all music TV shows in Russia, with average share 3,7% and rating 0.7%.

Nowadays programs with the same name are aired regularly at about 50 radio stations in ex-USSR countries. Ukrainian version of the show was launched in November 2021 and is hosted by Jerry Heil, Artyom Pivovarov and other Ukrainian popular singers.

Chart milestones 
 Dima Bilan and David Guetta are found to be the most aired musicians. They each have over 30 million of registered airplays.
 MakSim is the only singer in the chart's history, who has had four number one songs within a calendar year ("Отпускаю", "Знаешь ли ты", "Ветром стать", "Мой рай" in 2007).
 MakSim has had seven consecutive number one hits, which is considered an unbreakable record for other artists.
 Elka is the only artist to have topped the Annual General Chart twice and Annual Russian Chart three times on Tophit.
 Elka is the only Russian artist who topped all of the Tophit charts simultaneously, in 2010–2011.
 "Provence", performed by Elka, spent 109 weeks on Tophit General 100.
 Yulia Savicheva is the only artist to self-replace at the top of Tophit Audience Choice Chart.

Top Hit Live! concerts 

Annual concerts with participation of leaders of the rating and other Ukrainian and Russian pop stars (since 2005).

TopHit Spy 

Automatic radio air monitoring system to determine the most frequently played songs. Since 2017, TopHit began to independently monitor the airwaves of partner radio stations around the clock to obtain data (the number of stations at this point approached a thousand).

TopHit Pay 
This is a system for collecting donations ("donates") for musicians.

Top Hit Music Awards

Top Hit Music Awards is an annual awards ceremony established by TopHit in 2013. Russian artists, authors and producers are honored for outstanding achievements in popular music and record business, based on the data of song rotation on air of the radio stations. Ceremonies are held annually in Moscow. In April 2020, for the first time, the Top Hit Music Awards Ukraine recognized the best performers, authors, and record labels in Ukraine.

Yolka singer, one of the most popular Russian singers, honors Top Hit Music Awards as a tool for determining artists by their real statistical popularity, not by decisions of some jury. This also emphasizes professional nature of the award. Yolka was awarded multiple times, including "Artist of the decade award", as Top Hit measurements show that she is extremely popular among Russian-speaking listeners with over 19 million of airplays in 10 years.

There is a Top Hit Hall of Fame as a part of the award. Every year 10 nominees are announced by partnering radio stations, determined by voting. Then past Hall of Fame members elect 2 of them.

TimeOut showbiz magazine coined the ceremony a metaphor of "Unbiased Prize of Numbers which is based exceptionally on statistics and is not subject to objections".

Recognition 
Experts from the InterMedia news agency, Evgeny Safronov and Aleksey Mazhaev, expressed the opinion that the charts published by the portal could not fully reflect the artist popularity in Russia, as Tophit along with Moskva.FM deal with radio industry research. Nevertheless, the experts qualified the portal hit parades as professional. Boris Barabanov also marked that Tophit.ru activity is more familiar to the music industry professionals than public at large. "One of the most effective chart-based sources is Tophit.ru. It's rather a reliable, in professional circles, mechanism that allows the rightholders to place their compositions on the website and make them available for station download. The latter ones, in their turn, having downloaded the song, send reports on its rotation, if this song is put on air, which shows its popularity. Tophit.ru promotion model is considered very effective on the market," wrote the author. Guru Ken called Tophit the leader in the area of media content delivery to radio stations. In the journal Kompania (Company), Anastasia Markina also mentioned the portal as the leader in its professional sphere and wrote, "Tophit.ru took under its wing over 400 stations and 60 TV-channels. On the other hand, over a thousand rights holders, among which are the majority of record labels, including the majors Sony Music, Universal Music, Warner Music and EMI/Gala Records», work with this website."

In RMA (a course of lectures for professionals in the music business), Dmitry Konnov, Universal Music Russia CEO, speaking of Russian music promotion perspectives, underlined the fact that "if you want to reach popularity, I advise to write and perform Russian music, promote Russian artists and keep a close watch at Tophit.ru but not get lost in admiration at Billboard".

In 2010, the summary statistical data of the portal for the year of 2009 became the foremost source in defining the nominees for "Bog Efira" (Air God) Music Awards (a music version of Popov's Award in the area of radio broadcast). Tophit annual charts are also covered in the mass media.

See also
 Music of Ukraine
 Music of Russia

References

External links
 

Record charts
Russian music